Cecil Johnson (born August 19, 1955) is a former professional American football player who played linebacker for nine seasons for the Tampa Bay Buccaneers. Cecil was the brother of Robert Johnson, a drummer for KC and the Sunshine Band.

External links
Dr. Jekyll And Mr. Johnson

1955 births
Living people
Players of American football from Miami
American football linebackers
Tampa Bay Buccaneers players
Pittsburgh Panthers football players